The Agnes Lynch Starrett Poetry Prize is a major American literary award for a first full-length book of poetry in the English language.

This prize of the University of Pittsburgh Press  in Pittsburgh, Pennsylvania, United States was initiated by Ed Ochester and developed by Frederick A. Hetzel. The prize is named for a former director of the Press. It has both recognized and supported emerging poets, which has allowed their work to become available to readers around the world.

The award is open to any poet writing in English who has not had a full-length book published previously. Entry requires the payment of a significant fee.    A "full-length book" of poetry is defined as a volume of 48 or more pages published in an edition of 500 or more copies. The prize carries a cash award of $5,000 and publication by the University of Pittsburgh Press in the Pitt Poetry Series. The winner is announced in the fall of each year.

Winners

1981 — Kathy Callaway, Heart of the Garfish
1982 — Lawrence Joseph, Shouting at No One 
1983 — Kate Daniels, The White Wave 
1984 — Arthur Smith, Elegy on Independence Day 
1985 — Liz Rosenberg, The Fire Music 
1986 — Robley Wilson, Kingdoms of the Ordinary 
1987 — David Rivard, Torque 
1988 — Maxine Scates, Toluca Street 
1989 — Nancy Vieira Couto, The Face in the Water 
1990 — Debra Allbery, Walking Distance 
1991 — Julia Kasdorf, Sleeping Preacher 
1992 — Hunt Hawkins, The Domestic Life 
1993 — Natasha Sajé, Red Under the Skin 
1994 — Jan Beatty, Mad River 
1995 — Sandy Solomon, Pears, Lake, Sun 
1996 — Helen Conkling, Red Peony Night 
1997 — Richard Blanco, City of a Hundred Fires 
1998 — Shara McCallum, The Water Between Us 
1999 — Daisy Fried, She Didn't Mean To Do It 
2000 — Quan Barry, Asylum 
2001 — Gabriel Gudding, A Defense of Poetry 
2002 — Shao Wei, Pulling a Dragon's Teeth 
2003 — David Shumate, High Water Mark 
2004 — Aaron Smith, Blue on Blue Ground  
2005 — Rick Hilles, Brother Salvage: Poems  
2006 — Nancy Krygowski, Velocity  
2007 — Michael McGriff, Dismantling the Hills 
2008 — Cheryl Dumesnil, In Praise of Falling  
2009 — Bobby C. Rogers, Paper Anniversary  
2010 — Glenn Shaheen, Predatory  
2011 — Dore Kiesselbach, Salt Pier
2012 — Kasey Jueds, Keeper 
2013 — Sarah Rose Nordgren, Best Bones 
2014 — Nate Marshall, Wild Hundreds 
2015 — Miriam Bird Greenberg, In the Volcano's Mouth 
2016 — Erin Adair-Hodges, Let's All Die Happy 
2017 — Tiana Clark, I Can't Talk About Trees Without the Blood 
2018 — Ryan Black, The Tenant of Fire 
2019 — Eleanor Boudreau, Earnest, Earnest?

Notes

See also
American poetry
List of poetry awards
List of literary awards
List of years in poetry
List of years in literature

References

"Past Winners Of the Agnes Lynch Starrett Poetry Prize", University of Pittsburgh Press

External links
 The Agnes Lynch Starrett Poetry Prize Homepage

American poetry awards
University of Pittsburgh